Bryotropha purpurella is a moth of the family Gelechiidae. It is found in Norway, Sweden, Finland, Latvia and Russia (European part of Russia, Transbaikalia and Altai).

The wingspan is 10–12 mm. The forewings are uniformly dark fuscous to black with a purple tinge. The hindwings are dark grey, but darker towards the apex. Adults have been recorded on wing from June to July.

References

Moths described in 1839
purpurella
Moths of Europe